The Mid-Cities Jr. Stars are a  USA Hockey-sanctioned Tier III Junior ice hockey team playing in the North American 3 Hockey League (NA3HL). The team plays their home games at Children’s Health StarCenter in Euless, Texas.

History
Established in 2013 as the Dallas Jr. Stars, the club entered the league to form a South Division along with the Topeka Capitals and Sugar Land Imperials. After a second place finish in their inaugural regular season, the Jr. Stars (16–22–2) went on a playoff run that ended in the Silver Cup Finals. A first round series sweep against third place Sugar Land Imperials earned a spot in the division finals against Topeka Capitals. The Stars eliminated Topeka, who finished the regular season 33 points ahead of Dallas, to advance into the 2014 NA3HL Silver Cup Finals. Dallas lost all three round robin games to close their first season.

In the summer of 2015, the team announced an affiliation agreement with the Coulee Region Chill of the North American Hockey League. Shortly after the affiliation, the team was purchased by KWM Kids, Inc. led by Michelle Bryant of La Crosse, Wisconsin, and owner of the Chill. As part of the new purchase the team became  the Euless Jr. Stars.

In 2017, the team was once again sold. The new owners were Brass Roots Hockey, LLC. led by Brad Allen who announced a new head coach in Tom Train and hired Tony Curtale as an advisor. The team was then re-branded as the Mid-Cities Jr. Stars for the 2017–18 season.

Season-by-season records

Alumni
The Jr. Stars have had a number of alumni move on to collegiate programs, higher levels of junior ice hockey in the United States and Canada.

References

External links
 Jr. Stars website
 NA3HL website

Ice hockey teams in Texas
Ice hockey teams in the Dallas–Fort Worth metroplex
2013 establishments in Texas
Ice hockey clubs established in 2013
Euless, Texas